Pierre-Alain Muet (born 1 January 1945 in Lyon) was a member of the National Assembly of France.  He represented the Rhône department from 2007 to 2017,  as a member of the Socialiste, radical, citoyen et divers gauche.

References

1945 births
Living people
Politicians from Lyon
Deputies of the 13th National Assembly of the French Fifth Republic
Deputies of the 14th National Assembly of the French Fifth Republic